{|

{{Infobox ship characteristics
|Hide header=
|Header caption= 
|Ship type=Fast attack craft
|Ship displacement=250 tons
|Ship length=
|Ship beam=
|Ship height=
|Ship draught=
|Ship power=
|Ship propulsion=3 × M504 B2 diesel engines, ordinary propeller propulsion; 
|Ship speed=*~ (Tuima & Tuuli)
~ (Tuisku & Tyrsky')
|Ship range=
|Ship endurance=
|Ship complement=25
|Ship sensors=
|Ship EW=
|Ship armament=*2 × double-barreled AK-230 30 mm/65 guns
1 × 12.7 mm machine gun
4 × SS-N-2A Styx
Mines (from 1994)
|Ship armour=
|Ship armor=
|Ship aircraft=
|Ship aircraft facilities=
|Ship notes=
}}
|}

The 'Tuima-class missile boat' was a class of fast attack craft used as missile boats by the Finnish Navy.

The vessels were constructed in the Soviet Union and purchased by the Finnish Navy between 1974 and 1975. The vessels were similar to the Soviet Project 205U Tsunami-class missile boats, given the NATO reporting name Osa II.

All of the vessels were later modified into fast minelayers at Aker Finnyards when their armament became obsolete. The modification work took place between 1993 and 1994 at the Uusikaupunki yards. Tuima and Tuuli had their missiles removed and the superstructure was modified. Mine rails and mine loading equipment were installed and the weapons guidance systems were modernized. Tuisku and Tyrsky were also modernized into fast minelayers, but less extensively, removing their missile weapons, and installing mine rails. The Tuima-class vessels belonged to the 5th Minewarfare Squadron based at Upinniemi.

The vessels of the class were decommissioned by 2000.

The Tuima class had three 56-cylinder radial diesel engines, each one producing . The middle engine and propeller shaft of Tuima and Tuuli were removed during the modernization to make space for the mine laying equipment. The class was known amongst the Finnish Navy conscripts as "Tuska" (Agony) class or "Moskvich" after a Russian car brand of that name. They were not considered as pleasant places to serve because of their poor ergonomics.

After decommissioning, the vessels were moored at Loviisa, and it was planned that one was to be transferred to the new Maritime Museum in Kotka. However, in October 2006, the Finnish Ministry of Defence stated that all four were to be sold to Egypt where they were refitted and taken into active service.

Vessels of the class
 Tuima (11)
 Tuuli (12)
 Tuisku (14)
 Tyrsky'' (15)

References

Missile boat classes
Missile boats of the Finnish Navy
Minelayers of the Finnish Navy
Minelayers of the Egyptian Navy
 
Missile boats of the Soviet Union
Finland–Soviet Union relations